Davie is a surname and masculine given name. It may also refer to:

Places
 Davie, Florida, United States, a town
 Davie County, North Carolina, United States
 Davie Village and Davie Street, a neighbourhood and street in Vancouver, British Columbia, Canada

Other uses
 Davie baronets, an extinct title in the Baronetage of England
 Davie Shipbuilding, a historic shipbuilding company in Quebec, Canada
 Davie School, Davie, Florida, on the National Register of Historic Places